Amphimallon ochraceum is a species of beetle in the Melolonthinae subfamily that can be found in Austria, Italy, Spain and the Britain I.

References

Beetles described in 1801
ochraceum
Beetles of Europe